Poom Saksansin (born 4 June 1993) is a Thai professional golfer.

Saksansin represented Thailand at the 2010 Asian Games, the 2011 and 2013 Southeast Asian Games and the 2012 Eisenhower Trophy. At the 2011 Southeast Asian Games, he won the gold medal in the team event. At the 2013 Southeast Asian Games, he won the bronze medal in the individual event and the gold medal in the team event.

Saksansin turned professional in 2013 and played on the Asian Tour and Asian Development Tour. He won the 2015 PGM Kinrara Championship on the Asian Development Tour. He has won three times on the Asian Tour; the BNI Indonesian Masters in 2016 and 2018 and the 2017 TAKE Solutions Masters.

Amateur wins
2010 Thailand Stroke Play, Putra Cup

Source:

Professional wins (7)

Asian Tour wins (3)

1Co-sanctioned by the Professional Golf Tour of India

Asian Development Tour wins (1)

1Co-sanctioned by the Professional Golf of Malaysia Tour

All Thailand Golf Tour wins (2)

Thailand PGA Tour wins (1)

Results in major championships

"T" = tied

Results in World Golf Championships

"T" = Tied

Team appearances
Amateur
Asian Games (representing Thailand): 2010
Southeast Asian Games (representing Thailand): 2011 (winners), 2013 (winners)
Eisenhower Trophy (representing Thailand): 2012

Professional
EurAsia Cup (representing Asia): 2018

References

External links

Poom Saksansin
Asian Tour golfers
Golfers at the 2010 Asian Games
Poom Saksansin
Southeast Asian Games medalists in golf
Poom Saksansin
Poom Saksansin
Competitors at the 2011 Southeast Asian Games
Competitors at the 2013 Southeast Asian Games
Poom Saksansin
1993 births
Living people